Martín de Telleria (17th century) was a Basque nobleman in the service of the Spanish Crown. He served as navigator, Captain, and as Governor of the Margarita Island, during the Spanish colonization of the Americas.

Biography 

Telleria was born in Guipúzcoa, (Spain), son of Santiago de Telleria. He was appointed on February 19, 1669, as Governor of Isla de Margarita, some sources said who the name Castillo San Carlos de Borromeo  was given by the governor of Margarita, Martin de Telleria, in honor of King Carlos II. Telleria remained in office until December 1671.

Martín Telleria had also served for the Viceroyalty of Peru, in July 1659 he had departed from the port of San Sebastián, bound for Buenos Aires. The crew had arrived at the port of the city in 1660, aboard the Ship "Nuestra Señora de Aranzazu". Telleria had been authorized by the King of Spain, to lead arms, ammunition and two companies of infantry to reinforce the  Fuerte de Buenos Aires.

References

External links 
www.archivesportaleurope.net

1610s births
1690s deaths
Spanish colonial governors and administrators
People from Buenos Aires
People from San Sebastián
Spanish navigators
Colonial Venezuela